Il Tigre, internationally released as The Tiger and the Pussycat, is a 1967 Italian comedy film directed by Dino Risi. For his performance, Vittorio Gassman won the David di Donatello for best actor; the film also won the David di Donatello for best producer.

Plot 
In Rome, Francesco Vincenzini is married and has recently become a grandfather. The teenaged son of Francesco tries to kill himself after his affections are rejected by Carolina, a beautiful art student.

Francesco decides to confront the young woman and condemn what she has done. Instead, he is seduced by her. His fling with Carolina makes him feel young again, but he begins to neglect his family and his work.

Invited to run off to Paris with her, Francesco writes a farewell letter to his wife, Esperia, and leaves for the train station. At the last minute, he comes to his senses and decides to return home where Esperia pretends that she did not read his letter.

Cast 
Vittorio Gassman: Francesco Vincenzini
Ann-Margret: Carolina
Eleanor Parker: Esperia Vincenzini
Fiorenzo Fiorentini: Tazio
Antonella Steni: Pinella
Luigi Vannucchi: President 
Caterina Boratto: Delia
Jacques Herlin: Monsignor
Eleonora Brown: Luisella

Production
It was one of several films Ann-Margret made in Europe around this time.

References

External links

1967 films
Commedia all'italiana
Films directed by Dino Risi
Films set in Rome
Films shot in Rome
Films with screenplays by Age & Scarpelli
1967 comedy films
1960s Italian-language films
1960s Italian films